The Kovda is a river in the south of the Kola Peninsula in Murmansk Oblast and Republic of Karelia, Russia. The Kovda originates in the Lake Topozero and flows through the lakes Lake Pyaozero and Lake Kovdozero into the Kandalaksha Gulf.

The drainage basin of the Kovda includes the biggest lakes of the north of the Republic of Karelia and the south of Murmansk Oblast, such as Lake Topozero, Lake Pyaozero, Lake Tikshozero, and Lake Kovdozero.

References

Rivers of Murmansk Oblast
Rivers of the Republic of Karelia